Ivan Glasenberg (born 7 January 1957) is a South African business executive and former chief executive officer of Glencore, one of the world's largest commodity trading and mining companies. In December 2020 it was announced that Glasenberg will retire as chief executive by June 2021. Glasenberg has or had citizenship of South Africa and Australia. He became a Swiss citizen in 2011. He is also on the board of mining company Minara Resources Ltd.

Background and early career
Glasenberg was born 7 January 1957 in South Africa to a Jewish family. His father, Samuel Glasenberg, was "a luggage manufacturer and importer born in Lithuania", and his mother, Blanche Vilensky, was South African. The family lived in Illovo, a suburb of Johannesburg. Glasenberg was an athlete, and by his early 20s was national junior champion in race walking. Ivan married Elana Beverley Orelowitz in 1984. In his youth Glasenberg was also a friend of Mick Davis, who would become the CEO of mining company Xstrata.

Glasenberg graduated with a Bachelor of Commerce and a Bachelor of Accountancy from the University of the Witwatersrand, South Africa. Glasenberg was with Nexia Levitt Kirson, a firm of chartered accountants, for five years and is a Chartered Accountant, South Africa [CA (SA)]. He received his MBA from the IBEAR program at University of Southern California in 1983.

Business career

Glencore International
Glasenberg joined Glencore in 1984, working in the coal department in South Africa and Australia. He managed Glencore's Hong Kong and Beijing offices from 1989 to 1990, and became head of the company's coal department in 1991. He was named CEO in 2002.

In 2005, BusinessWeek referred to Glasenberg as a key figure in the secretive commodities trading of Marc Rich's company Mark Rich & Co. AG. Rich was a billionaire commodities trader, who was charged with tax evasion and illegal deals with Iran, but later pardoned by US President Bill Clinton. Glencore is the corporate successor to Marc Rich & Co AG.

In September 2011, using his own dividends, Glasenberg started buying a larger share of Glencore, buying up to an additional 54 million of Glencore stock. In April 2012 it was reported that Glasenberg held more than 15 per cent of Glencore's stock, placing him as the 20th richest mining billionaire, with Forbes estimating his net worth at US$7.3 billion.

In December 2020, Glasenberg announced that he will be retiring in 2021 thus stepping out of the CEO position after nearly 20 years. He was succeeded by fellow South African Gary Nagle, who was running the firm's coal business.

Glencore Xstrata
Glasenberg became CEO of the merged entity created when Glencore and Xstrata finalised one of the largest mining company mergers in history creating an US$88 billion company. Originally Xstrata CEO Mick Davis was to be CEO while Glasenberg would be President in a merger-of-equals transaction, however, due to holding out of major Xstrata shareholder Qatar, it became a takeover target, with a 3.05 Glencore to 1 Xstrata Share exchange to create the new entity Glencore Xstrata with Glasenberg becoming CEO. Davis left the company in July 2013.

Glasenberg has served an executive director of Xstrata Plc (since 2002); and as a non-executive director of Minara Resources Ltd (since 2000); of Rusal Plc (since 2007); and Century Aluminum Co. (between 2010–2011).

Personal life
Glasenberg has been a champion race-walker for both South Africa and Israel, and runs and swims daily to maintain his fitness. He is married with two children, and a resident of the village of Rüschlikon in Switzerland. Glasenberg paid 360 million SFr (£240m) in taxes to Rüschlikon following Glencore's flotation on the London Stock Exchange.  The money enabled the residents to cut their taxation rate by 7%, which was approved by large majority after a public vote, and attracted criticism from some villagers about Glencore's alleged controversial business practices.

As of 2022 his net worth was US$9.1 billion.

References

Further reading

1957 births
Living people
Australian Jews
Australian billionaires
Australian people of Lithuanian-Jewish descent
South African billionaires
South African commodities traders
South African financiers
South African Jews
South African people of Lithuanian-Jewish descent
South African investors
South African stock traders
South African emigrants to Australia
Swiss financiers
Swiss Jews
Swiss investors
Swiss stock traders
Marshall School of Business alumni
University of the Witwatersrand alumni
Swiss billionaires
Glencore people
Businesspeople in metals
People named in the Paradise Papers